The slaty-bellied tesia (Tesia olivea) is a species of warbler in the family Cettiidae.

It is found in Bangladesh, Bhutan, China, India, Laos, Myanmar, Nepal, Thailand, and Vietnam. Its natural habitats are subtropical or tropical moist lowland forest and subtropical or tropical moist montane forest.

References

External links
Image at ADW

slaty-bellied tesia
Birds of Eastern Himalaya
Birds of Yunnan
Birds of Myanmar
Birds of Thailand
Birds of Laos
Birds of Vietnam
slaty-bellied tesia
Taxonomy articles created by Polbot